
Year 522 (DXXII) was a common year starting on Saturday (link will display the full calendar) of the Julian calendar. At the time, it was known as the Year of the Consulship of Symmachus and Boethius (or, less frequently, year 1275 Ab urbe condita). The denomination 522 for this year has been used since the early medieval period, when the Anno Domini calendar era became the prevalent method in Europe for naming years.

Events 
 By place 
 Europe 
 Anicius Manlius Severinus Boethius, Roman philosopher, is arrested on charges of having conspired against Theodoric the Great. He is imprisoned at Pavia (Lombardy).
 Amalaric, age 20, is proclaimed king of the Visigoths. His kingdom is threatened from the north by the Burgundians.

 Arabia 
 Dhu Nuwas seizes the throne of the Himyarite Kingdom in Yemen. He attacks the Aksumite garrison at Zafar, capturing the city and burning the churches. 
Dhū Nuwas moves to Najran, an Aksumite stronghold. After accepting the city's capitulation, he massacres the Christian inhabitants (some sources estimate a death toll up to 20,000).

Births 
 15 October – Colmán of Cloyne, Irish monk (d. 600)
 Clodoald, Merovingian prince (approximate date)
 Wen Di, emperor of the Chen Dynasty (d. 566)

Deaths 
 Eutharic, son-in-law of Theodoric the Great
 Galan Erilich, king of the Picts (approximate date)
 Liu Xie, Chinese writer (approximate date) (b. 465)

References